Karoline Helena de Souza (born 24 April 1990) is a Brazilian handball player for CS Minaur Baia Mare (women's handball) and for the Brazilian national team.

Achievements
Women Handball Austria:
Winner: 2013
ÖHB Cup:
Winner: 2013
EHF Cup Winners' Cup
 Winner: 2013
 Pan American Championship:
Winner: 2011
 World Championship:
Winner: 2013

References

1990 births
Living people
Brazilian female handball players
Expatriate handball players
Brazilian expatriate sportspeople in Austria
Brazilian expatriate sportspeople in Denmark
Brazilian expatriate sportspeople in Hungary
Siófok KC players
21st-century Brazilian women